Benu Sen (26 May 1932 – 17 May 2011) was an Indian photographer from Kolkata, India. He was the second son among seven children of Manindranath and Provabati Sengupta.

He was the Secretary General of the Federation of Indian Photography (FIP), the Indian chapter of the Fédération Internationale de l'Art Photographique (FIAP), and president of the Photographic Association of Dum Dum (PAD).
In his book, History of Journalism: A Legend of Glory, Prof. Santanu Banerjee mentioned, "His passion was to guide the oncoming photographers in the profession. During his life span, he made a pretty number of students dazzled in the arena of photography."

Career
A Photography Unit was set up in the Indian Museum in 1964 for photo documentation of art objects. Sen was in-charge of the unit. He retired from the museum as Photo Officer in 1990 having contributed many photographic works both in the field of social and cultural anthropology and museum related photographs.

Publications

Publications by Sen
Art of Photography (1979)

Publications paired with others
Learn Photography. Photographic Association of Dum Dum.
Experimental Photography. Photographic Association of Dum Dum.

Awards
Life-Time Achievement award of Rs. 100,000 and a citation in the pictorialists category conferred by the Vice-President of India, Mohammad Hamid Ansari, 2010, New Delhi.
Master of Photography (MFIAP), Fédération Internationale de l'Art Photographique
Fellowship of the Royal Photographic Society of Great Britain (FRPS), 1975
EFIAP, Fédération Internationale de l'Art Photographique, 1960
ESFIAP, Fédération Internationale de l'Art Photographique, 1972
FJIAP (Japan)
FNPAS (Sri Lanka)
FPBS (Bangladesh)
FPAD (India)
FCOS (Romania)

Health issues and death

Sen was undergoing treatment at a private hospital in Barasat near Kolkata, from 7 to 15 April 2011, as he had been suffering from retention of urine due to prostate enlargement and low haemoglobin count due to his previous heart problem with diabetes mellitus. Surgery of the prostate gland was suggested.

On the evening of 19 April 2011 Benu Sen was readmitted to the previous hospital at Barasat, for a pre-surgical preparation of prostate gland  surgery. Some physiological problems developed due to his old age. On 16 May 2011 Sen suffered from a serious chest infection, leading to the deterioration of his health and he was transferred to the Intensive Care Unit (ICU). He died on 17 May 2011 in Barasat.

References

External links

1932 births
20th-century Indian photographers
Artists from Kolkata
2011 deaths
Indian art curators
Indian photojournalists
20th-century Indian journalists
Indian portrait photographers
Journalists from West Bengal
Writers from Kolkata
Photographers from West Bengal